Parliamentary elections were held in Nicaragua in November 1926 to elect half of the seats in the Chamber of Deputies and one-third of the seats in the Senate of the National Congress.

"The congressional elections which were postponed awaiting the outcome of the Corinto Conference were held late in November [1926] except in the Departments of León, Chinandega, and Esteli, where the unsettled conditions made elections impossible."

References

Elections in Nicaragua
Nicaragua
1926 in Nicaragua
November 1926 events
Election and referendum articles with incomplete results